Goodstart Early Learning is Australia's largest early learning provider. Formed in 2010 by a syndicate of charities, Goodstart is a not-for-profit organisation that currently has 649 child care centres around Australia. Goodstart's head office is located in Brisbane, Australia, in the suburb of Murarrie. Across Australia, approximately 70,000 children attend Goodstart. Goodstart currently employs more than 13,000 staff members.

History 
Goodstart was formed after a syndication of charities bought out ABC Learning Centres when they went into voluntary liquidation in 2008. The Goodstart syndicate was built in two separate stages. The Benevolent Society, Social Ventures Australia, and Mission Australia came together in 2008. The Brotherhood of St Laurence joined the group in 2009.

The group approached private and public investors to raise the capital needed to buy out ABC Learning. With $15 million contributed by the Australian Federal Government as a medium-term loan, the syndication of charities was named as the preferred bidders in December 2009.

Centres and facilities 
Goodstart centres provide 3 types of care. These include: 
 Early learning and childcare 
 Kindergarten and preschool 
 Vacation and before/after school care.

Please note: Not every centre offers vacation care and before/after school care, parents, guardians and caregivers are recommended to contact their local centre to confirm what is provided and available to families and children.

Goodstart centres are primarily located in and near capital cities. Only 20% of centres are in regional or rural locations.

Social impact 
Goodstart states one of its strategic goals as being “Inclusion – Enhance outcomes for children in vulnerable circumstances”.

A report delivered by independent organisation Impact Investing Australia found: 
 Goodstart has over 170 centres located in communities with a Socio-Economic Index (SEIFA) in the bottom 30% of communities. 
 130 centres are in communities where the percentage of children assessed as developmentally vulnerable through the Australian Early Development Index (AEDI) is 1.5 times higher than the national average.
 Over 1,000 children with special needs are catered for in Goodstart centres annually.

Financial status 
Goodstart is a Public Company and is ranked at 454 out of the top 2,000 companies in Australia. Total revenue generated in 2016 was reported as more than $900,000,000.

News and research 
Goodstart has been in the news for current affairs and research contributions throughout the years they have been operating. Summaries of recent articles include:
 February 2020: Two staff working for Goodstart Early Learning in Edmonton (QLD) were charged with manslaughter, following the death of a three-year-old who was left in a daycare pickup van for a number of hours.
 July 2017: Goodstart Early Learning in Glenfield Park (NSW) participated in a joint initiative with the Riviera Gums Retirement Village. Ongoing from January, children visited residents for an hour each month and did activities with them.
 June 2017: Goodstart Early Learning in Goonellabah (NSW) had an electrical fire scare after a hot joint in the meter box. The centre was evacuated and no major damage was recorded.   
 January 2017: An employee from an Oxenford centre (in Queensland) lodged a statement of claim against Goodstart after sustaining a personal injury while changing a nappy in June 2014.
 March 2017: Goodstart found 60% of households find child care unaffordable. They surveyed more than 1,500 families, and 82% of respondents said they would work more if child care was more affordable. 
 May 2016: Local parents publicly opposed the proposed expansion of the Myaree (WA) centre, citing increased traffic and decreased quality of care as key concerns.

References 

2010 establishments in Australia
Child care companies
Companies based in Brisbane